Andrei Ivanov (born March 10, 1981) is a Russian professional ice hockey winger who plays for HK Välk 494 Tartu of the Estonian Hockey League. He has formerly played in the Kontinental Hockey League (KHL).

References

External links

1981 births
Living people
Ak Bars Kazan players
Avangard Omsk players
HK Gomel players
HC Lada Togliatti players
HC Neftekhimik Nizhnekamsk players
SKA Saint Petersburg players
Ice hockey people from Saint Petersburg
HC Sochi players
HC Yugra players
Russian ice hockey forwards